The 1957 New Mexico A&M Aggies football team was an American football team that represented New Mexico College of Agriculture and Mechanical Arts (now known as New Mexico State University) as a member of the Border Conference during the 1957 NCAA University Division football season.  In their third and final year under head coach Tony Cavallo, the Aggies compiled a 3–7 record (0–4 against conference opponents), finished last in the conference, and were outscored by a total of 215 to 157. The team played its home games at Memorial Stadium.

Schedule

References

New Mexico AandM
New Mexico State Aggies football seasons
New Mexico AandM Aggies football